The Fournier RF7 was a single-seat motorglider designed and built in prototype form by René Fournier in France in 1970 and intended for series production by Sportavia-Pützer in Germany.

Design and development
The RF7 was a conventional motorglider design derived from Fournier's RF 4D, a low-wing cantilever monoplane with an engine mounted in tractor configuration in the nose. The sailplane-style undercarriage consisted of a retractable mainwheel, a fixed tailwheel, and small outriggers under each wing. Compared to the RF 4. the wings were shorter and the tailplane surfaces larger. The ailerons were also larger, and the RF7 was fully stressed for aerobatics.

Construction of the prototype (registered F-WPXV) began in July 1969, and the aircraft first flew on 5 March 1970. It was displayed at the Hanover Air Show the following month, where the journal Flight International praised it for the quality of its finish "[i]n spite of its prototype status." By 1971, Sportavia-Pützer abandoned its plans of series production of the type and hoped to market the RF7 in kit form instead. By 1978, all development had been abandoned and the prototype was offered for sale.

Specifications

See also

Notes

References

 
 
 
 
 

1970s French sport aircraft
Fournier aircraft
Sportavia-Pützer aircraft
Motor gliders
Single-engined tractor aircraft
Low-wing aircraft
Aircraft first flown in 1970